The Puerto Rico State Agency for Emergency and Disaster Management  (AEMEAD) is the agency of the executive branch of the government of Puerto Rico that oversees all emergency activities that occur in Puerto Rico. Its mission is to coordinate all the resources of the government of Puerto Rico in order to administer all the phases of emergency management (mitigation, preparation, recovery, and response) in the case of a natural or technological disaster while preventing and minimizing all damage to life and property. It also coordinates similar functions with the federal government of the United States and foreign countries, as well as offering help to and cooperating with the private sector.

The agency coordinates tsunami exercises with ham radio operators.

Abner Gomez was the agency's managing director when Hurricane Maria hit and knocked out power to the entire island, but resigned soon after.

The agency was previously known as the State Agency of the Civil Defense until Act number 211 derogated the Civil Defense organic law and instituted AEMEAD instead.

In January 2020, the director of the agency was fired when two-year old, unused supplies were discovered in a warehouse.

References

Emergency management in Puerto Rico
Puerto Rico Commission on Safety and Public Protection